Ismail Asif Waheed (born 13 August 1968) is a Maldivian sprinter. He competed in the men's 100 metres at the 1988 Summer Olympics.

References

External links
 

1968 births
Living people
Athletes (track and field) at the 1988 Summer Olympics
Maldivian male sprinters
Olympic athletes of the Maldives
Place of birth missing (living people)